Brigita Ivanauskaitė (born 24 April 1993) is a Lithuanian handballer who plays for HC Rödertal and the Lithuania national team.

Personal life
She has a twin sister named Roberta Ivanauskaitė who is also a handballer and plays abroad in Denmark.

References

1998 births
Living people
Lithuanian female handball players
Twin sportspeople
Lithuanian twins
Expatriate handball players
Lithuanian expatriate sportspeople in Norway